Stepan Nikitich Begichev (22 July 1785 – 3 September 1859) was a Russian Empire colonel and memoirist, brother of Dmitry Begichev and Yablochkova Elizaveta

Family 
 Father - Captain Nikita Begichev
 Mother - Alexandra Kologrivova
 Brother - Dmitry Nikitich Begichev (b. 09/17/1786 - d. 11/12/1855), writer
 Sister - Elizaveta Nikitichna Begicheva (Yablochkova) (b. 1771 - d.1843), writer, grandmother of Pavel Yablochkov inventor of Yablochkov candle electric carbon arc lamp

Friends/connections 
While living in Moscow, his house was visited by his close friends such as Prince Vladimir Odoyevsky (philosopher, writer, music critic), Denis Davydov (soldier-poet), Wilhelm Küchelbecker (Romantic poet), Alexey Verstovsky (composer) and Alexander Griboyedov (writer). In 1819 he had 175 'souls' assigned to his properties. Member of the Military Society (possibly saving the Union) and the Union of Welfare. He was buried in village Yekaterininskaya of Epifanskie County of Tula Oblast.

First wife 
Anna Baryshnikova - married 29 April 1823

Children 
 Nikita (b. 1827)
 Nadezhda (b. 28 July 1828 – d. 1848) (Goddaughter of Alexander Griboyedov)
 Yekaterina (b. 1829 - d.) in a marriage Tilicheeva
 Ivan (b. 1831 - d.)
 Dmitry (b. 1832 - d.)
 Maria (b. 1833 - d. 1918)

Second wife 
Maria Ivanovna Lelu (French governess) - Married 1844

Military career 
 18 November 1795—Enrolled into Page Corps
 8 February 1802 -- Cornet of Alexandria Hussars
 21 August 1802—Transferred into Olonetsky Musketeer Regiment as an ensign
 21 September 1803 -- Dismissed
 1807—Joined the Tula Police Force
 13 January 1813—Re-enrolled as a Cornet & was appointed as an adjutant to his relative, General Alexey S Kologrivov
 21 May 1813—Transferred to the Cavalry Regiment in the same rank of Cornet
 1814—Promoted to the rank of Lieutenant
 26 January 1817—Deployed to the front
 13 March 1818—Staff-Captain
 13 March 1819—Captain
 9 July 1819—Colonel of Tiraspol Horse-Jaeger Regiment
 15 September 1825—Retired as Colonel

References 

1785 births
1859 deaths
Writers from the Russian Empire